Emanuele Grazzi was an Italian diplomat. He was the Italian ambassador to Greece during World War II, delivering Benito Mussolini's ultimatum to Greek prime minister Ioannis Metaxas on 28 October 1940. The refusal of Italian demands led to the beginning of the Greco-Italian War and Greece's joining of World War II.

Biography

Grazzi was born in Florence on 30 May 1891. He graduated in law from the University of Pisa in 1911.

He was appointed Consular Attaché and sent to Tunis in 1912. He returned to the Ministry in 1913 and was subsequently sent to Helsingfors, first as Italian delegate and then as chargé d'affaires in the Inter-Allied Economic Committee (1919). He then served in Berlin becoming Regent of the Consulate in 1920 and was then appointed Consul in Florianopolis in 1922. In 1924 he returned to the Ministry. He was transferred to Toulouse in 1925 and in 1927 to New York as Consul General.

He was chargé d'affaires in Guatemala in 1932, and returned to the Ministry in 1934 to work for the Press and Propaganda. He was appointed Director General of the Foreign Press Service in 1935. In 1939 he was transferred to Athens. On 28 October 1940, following instructions received, he presented an ultimatum to General Joannis Metaxas, Prime Minister and Greek dictator, in which Mussolini demanded that all of Greece be occupied by Italian troops. He was later recalled to the Ministry. In 1943 he was sent to Belgrade.
 
In 1944 he joined the Italian Social Republic and was sent to Budapest, where he stayed only a few days. He left his career at the end of 1947.

He died in 1961.

See also 
 Ministry of Foreign Affairs (Italy)
 Foreign relations of Italy

References

External links
 

Diplomats from Florence
1891 births
1961 deaths
Italian diplomats
20th-century diplomats